Olav Askvik (12 May 1915 – 28 June 2011) was a Norwegian politician for the Liberal Party.

He served as a deputy representative to the Norwegian Parliament from Møre og Romsdal during the term 1965–1969.

On the local level Askvik was mayor of Molde municipality from 1970 to 1971.

References

1915 births
2011 deaths
Deputy members of the Storting
Liberal Party (Norway) politicians
Mayors of places in Møre og Romsdal
Place of birth missing